Fuente de Piedra Lagoon is a wetland located in the Málaga province of Spain. It is used by the greater flamingo for its annual reproduction cycle, constituting the largest colony on the Iberian Peninsula of this beautiful and delicate bird. The lagoon is fed by underwater springs that pass through mineral salt deposits, so the lagoon is saline - indeed salt was harvested until recently.

It is elliptical in shape.

Evaporation is a major factor for the lagoon. The flamingos need a certain amount of water to breed and will desert the eggs if the lagoon dries out too soon.

References

Ramsar sites in Spain
Landforms of Andalusia
Geography of the Province of Málaga